Valois station is a commuter rail station operated by Exo in Pointe-Claire, Quebec, Canada, located in the Valois neighborhood. It is served by the Vaudreuil–Hudson line.

 on weekdays, 10 of 11 inbound trains and 10 of 12 outbound trains on the line call at this station, with the others skipping it. On weekends, all trains (four on Saturday and three on Sunday in each direction) call here. 

The station is located north of Autoroute 20 at the corner of Avenue Donegani and Avenue de la Baie-de-Valois. The original station building is extant but is no longer in passenger service; instead, it is used by a community resource centre. The station has two side platforms; access between them is provided by a tunnel with headhouses on either side of the tracks and a third located south of the highway. In 2016, the station became the first one on this line to possess its own work of art. The MU artistic organization arranged the creation of a mural on and inside the northern headhouse: L'empreinte de l'homme by Ilana Pichon.

This station was open by 1889; the modern underpass was opened in 1980.

Bus connections

Société de transport de Montréal

References

External links
 Valois Commuter Train Station Information (RTM)
 Valois Commuter Train Station Schedule (RTM)
 2016 STM System Map

Exo commuter rail stations
Transport in Pointe-Claire
Railway stations in Montreal
Buildings and structures in Pointe-Claire